The Australian Environment Foundation (AEF) is a not-for-profit advocacy organisation. It has disputed the values of some mainstream environmental assertions, and also on occasion the evidence used to support those assertions. The AEF is skeptical on climate change, pro-logging, pro-big business, anti-wind energy, and against the Murray-Darling Basin plan.

History
The formation of the AEF was first mooted at the Eureka Forum organised in December 2004 by the Institute of Public Affairs (IPA) and a number of resource user groups. It was formally launched on World Environment Day (5 June 2005) in the northern New South Wales town of Tenterfield.

The founding chairman was former Labor federal environment minister, Barry Cohen AM. A subsequent chairman was gardener, author and television presenter Don Burke OAM. Reporting on the AEF's launch, the Melbourne broadsheet newspaper, The Age wrote: "Dr Marohasy said she acted as the group's leader as an individual and not part of the IPA." At the time of registration, the registered office was the same is the registered office of the IPA.

The group stated in its press release that "This new group will be vastly different to the established environment organisations that have had the ear of governments for some time. The AEF’s focus will be on making decisions based on science and what is good for both the environment and for people".

The organisation has been labelled a "fake environmental group" by community advocacy organisation GetUp!. In May 2014 the AEF came under criticism for lobbying for the de-listing of Tasmania's World Heritage old-growth forest.

Personnel

Former directors
Jennifer Marohasy, former Director
Barry Cohen AM, Inaugural Chairman of AEF, former ALP Environment Minister
Don Burke OAM, former Chairman

See also
Climate change denial

References

External links
 AEF Website

2005 establishments in Australia
Climate change denial
Environmental organisations based in Australia